While most symphonies have a number, many symphonies are known by their (nick)name.

This article lists symphonies that are numbered and have an additional nickname, and symphonies that are primarily known by their name and/or key. Also various compositions that contain "symphony" or "sinfonia" in their name are included, whether or not strictly speaking they adhere to the format of a classical symphony.

Sinfonia concertante is a different genre, and works of that genre are not included here, unless for those named works that are usually known as a symphony.

See also

 List of classical music sub-titles, nicknames and non-numeric titles

References

Notes

External links
Many more named symphonies in this Chronological list of symphonies

 List, names
 
Symphony
Nicknames in classical music